The National Commission on Military, National, and Public Service was a United States temporary federal agency established by the National Defense Authorization Act for Fiscal Year 2017.

Purpose

The commission was formed by Congress to:
 conduct a review of the military selective service process (commonly referred to as ‘‘the draft’’); and
 consider methods to increase participation in military, national, and public service in order to address national security and other public service needs of the Nation.

Scope of Review

The legislation creating the commission outlined that the commission should consider:

 the need for a military selective service process, including the continuing need for a mechanism to draft large numbers of replacement combat troops;
 means by which to foster a greater attitude and ethos of service among United States youth, including an increased propensity for military service;
 the feasibility and advisability of modifying the military selective service process in order to obtain for military, national, and public service individuals with skills (such as medical, dental, and nursing skills, language skills, cyber skills, and science, technology, engineering, and mathematics (STEM) skills) for which the Nation has a critical need, without regard to age or sex; and
 the feasibility and advisability of including in the military selective service process, as so modified, an eligibility or entitlement for the receipt of one or more Federal benefits (such as educational benefits, subsidized or secured student loans, grants or hiring preferences) specified by the Commission for purposes of the review.

Commissioners

Appointed members of the Commission were:

Activities

The Commission requested written comments from the public on a list of questions it was considering, and held a series of hearings and site visits in 2018 including public meetings in Harrisburg, Pennsylvania, and Denver, Colorado. In 2019, the Commission held a series of formal public hearings with panels of invited witnesses. According to documents released in response to a Freedom Of Information Act (FOIA) request, the Commission also held closed-door meetings and received closed-door briefings. On 13 November 2019, members of the Commission held a conference call with anti-draft organizations and activists.

Minutes of the commission's deliberations and decisions were released by the National Archives and Records Administration in response to FOIA requests after the Commission was disbanded. In July 2018, the Commission voted 10-0 (one of the 11 members was absent and cast no vote by proxy) to recommend continued contingency planning for a draft. That left open the question of whether to continue, expand, or modify the Selective Service registration program. The Commission decided on most of its recommendations during a series of meetings from July 15–19, 2019, that it described as a "VOTE-O_RAMA". There were 7 Democratic appointments to the Commission (including 4 Congressional appointments and 3 appointments by President Obama) and 4 Republican Congressional appointments. To preclude purely party-line decisions, the Commissioners agreed to require 8 votes for any final recommendation. On 16 July 2019, the Commissioners voted 7-4 in favor of recommending expanding draft registration to women. According to their own self-imposed rules, this left them unable to make a recommendation on this issue. Two days later, after one of the Commissioners in the minority had been persuaded to change their vote, the NCMNPS reconsidered the question and voted 8-3 to recommend expanding draft registration to women.

Reports
On January 23, 2019, the Commission released an interim report outlining the various options. On March 25, 2020, after holding various public hearings and closed-door, invitation only meetings, the Commission issued its final report, recommending that the requirement for young men to register with the Selective Service System should be retained and should be expanded to young women as well as young men. The report also made various other recommendations with respect to the Selective Service System and voluntary national and public (government) service.

References

Agencies of the United States government